John A. Svahn (born May 13, 1943 in New London, Connecticut) is an American former Republican politician. He served as Commissioner of the Social Security Administration from 1981, as Under Secretary of Health and Human Services from March to September 1983, and as Assistant to the President for Policy Development from September 1983 in the administration of President Ronald Reagan.

References

1943 births
Commissioners of the Social Security Administration
Living people
Politicians from New London, Connecticut
Reagan administration personnel